Saifur Rahman (Saudi Arabia) is a male Muslim name, meaning sword of the Most Gracious. 

سيفور meaning Saifur in arabic. 

This may refer to:
Akhundzada Saif-ur-Rahman Mubarak (1925–2010), Sufi sheikh of the Naqshbandi Mujaddadi Tariqa
Saifur Rahman (Bangladeshi politician) (1932–2009), Bangladeshi economist and politician
Saifur Rehman (Pakistani politician), Pakistani politician
Saif-ur-Rehman (prisoner) (born 1982), Pakistani detained in Chile on suspicion of terrorism
Saif-ur-Rehman Mansoor (died c. 2007), Afghan Taliban commander
Saifur Rahman Halimi, Afghan-American
Saif-ur-Rehman (cricketer, born 1996) (born 1996), Pakistani cricketer
Saif-ur-Rehman (cricketer, born 1998) (born 1998), Pakistani cricketer

Arabic masculine given names